The 2003 Hamburg Masters was a men's tennis tournament played on outdoor clay courts. It was the 97th edition of the Hamburg Masters and was part of the Tennis Masters Series of the 2003 ATP Tour. It took place at the Am Rothenbaum in Hamburg, Germany from 12 May through 18 May 2003.

The singles field was headlined by new ATP No. 1, Scottsdale, Indian Wells winner and Masters Cup defending champion Lleyton Hewitt, Buenos Aires, Barcelona champion, Miami runner-up and Monte Carlo semifinalist Carlos Moyá and Marseille, Dubai, Munich winner and recent Rome finalist Roger Federer. Other top seeds competing were Memphis and Houston finalist Andy Roddick, 2002 French Open champion Albert Costa, Jiří Novák, Paradorn Srichaphan and David Nalbandian. Young Rafael Nadal at 16 defeated world number 4 Moya in 2 sets.

For the first time in a Tennis Masters Series tournament all four semifinalists were from the same country. The Argentine semifinalists were Guillermo Coria, Agustín Calleri, Gastón Gaudio and David Nalbandian.

Finals

Singles

 Guillermo Coria defeated  Agustín Calleri 6–3, 6–4, 6–4
 It was Coria's 1st title of the year and the 2nd of his career. It was his 1st Masters title of the year and his 1st overall.

Doubles

 Mark Knowles /  Daniel Nestor defeated  Mahesh Bhupathi /  Max Mirnyi 6–4, 7–6(12–10)
 It was Knowles' 4th title of the year and the 28th of his career. It was Nestor's 4th title of the year and the 30th of his career.

References

External links
  
   
 Association of Tennis Professionals (ATP) tournament profile

Hamburg Masters
Hamburg European Open
Hamburg Masters
May 2003 sports events in Europe